The Bova Marina Synagogue is the second oldest synagogue uncovered in Italy and one of the oldest in Europe.

The synagogue is located in Bova Marina, Calabria. Bova Marina means "Bova by the sea", in Italian. Only the Ostia Synagogue is older. The remains of the Bova Marina synagogue were unearthed in 1983 during road construction. The site features a mosaic floor with the image of a menorah and accompanying images of a shofar and a lulav to the right and an etrog on the left. In addition, there are other decorative motifs such as Solomon's Knots. There is also a wall niche thought to once contain Torah scrolls.

The synagogue was built in the 4th century with renovations dating to the 6th century. There appears to be an older structure beneath the site but trying to reach it would require destroying the ruins. The synagogue is a basilica-style building that resembles the Byzantine synagogues of the Galilee.
The building is oriented to south-east. The synagogue appears to have ceased functioning around the year 600 when the entire area seemed to have been abandoned. In addition to the site itself, many artifacts have been discovered such as amphora handles with menorah impressions and three thousand bronze coins.

In January 2011, Calabrian newspapers reported increase funding of 600,000 Euros for restoration of the Bova Marina archaeological park. The restoration is part of a regional plan to increase tourism. The project also calls for the opening of a museum to display Jewish artifacts excavated from the site.

Local rabbi Barbara Aiello conducts tours to the site as well as other Jewish heritage sites in southern Italy.

The ancient Jewish community of Calabria is one of the oldest in Europe.

See also
History of the Jews in Italy
History of the Jews in Calabria
Oldest synagogues in the world

References

External links
 https://web.archive.org/web/20090715220501/http://www.jewishroots.it/BovaMarina-p1.shtml

Synagogues in Italy
Ancient synagogues